Yi Hwang (1501–1570) was a Korean philosopher and writer.

Yi Hwang or Lee Hwang can also refer to:
 Yi Hwang, the founder of the Goseong Lee clan
 Yi Hwang (1450 – 1469), the personal name of King Yejong of Joseon
 Yi Hwang (1498 – 1506), deposed crown prince of Joseon, and son of Yeonsangun.